Rus or RUS may refer to:

People and places
 Rus (surname), a Romanian-language surname
 East Slavic historical territories and peoples. See Names of Rusʹ, Russia and Ruthenia
 Rusʹ people, the people of Rusʹ
 Rusʹ territories
 Kievan Rusʹ, a medieval East Slavic state, centered in Kiev
 Rusʹ Khaganate, a ninth-century Eastern European state
 Ruthenia
 Vladimir-Suzdal (Vladimirian Rusʹ), an East Slavic medieval state, centered in Vladimir
 Principality of Halych (Halychian Rusʹ), an East Slavic medieval state, in region of Halych
 Principality of Volhynia (Volhynian Rusʹ), an East Slavic medieval state, in regions of Volhynia
 Kingdom of Galicia–Volhynia (Halych-Volhynian Rusʹ), an East Slavic medieval state, uniting Halych and Volhynia
Kingdom of Rusʹ, an East Slavic medieval kingdom (Galicia-Volhynia)
 Principality of Turov (Turovian Rusʹ), an East Slavic medieval state, in region of Turov
 Principality of Polotsk (Polotskian Rusʹ), an East Slavic medieval state, in region of Polotsk
 Novgorod Republic (Novgorodian Rusʹ), an East Slavic medieval state, centered in Novgorod
 Grand Duchy of Moscow (Muscovite Rusʹ), an East Slavic medieval state, centered in Moscow
 Tsardom of Russia (Tsardom of Rusʹ), an East Slavic early modern state, centered in Moscow
 Little Russia (Minor Rusʹ), an East Slavic historical region
 Great Russia (Great Rusʹ), an East Slavic historical region
 White Ruthenia (White Rusʹ), an East Slavic historical region
 Red Ruthenia (Red Rusʹ), an East Slavic historical region
 Black Ruthenia (Black Rusʹ), an East Slavic historical region
 Carpathian Ruthenia (Red Rusʹ, Carpathian Rusʹ), an East Slavic historical region inhabited mostly by Rusyns (Rusynia), and a 1918–1919 provisional autonomous region, known as the "Rusyn Land"
 Carpathian Ruthenia (Subcarpathian Rusʹ), an administrative region of the First Czechoslovak Republic
 Western Rus (disambiguation)
Principality of Rusʹ (disambiguation)
Grand Principality of Rusʹ (disambiguation)
 Rus, a legendary eponymous ancestor, see Lech, Czech and Rus

Acronyms
 Rajshahi University School
 Réacteur Université de Strasbourg, a French nuclear research reactor
 Resonant ultrasound spectroscopy, a laboratory technique
Route utilisation strategy
Rural Utilities Service, an agency of the United States Department of Agriculture
Raptor Upper Stage, a version of the SpaceX Raptor rocket engine

Codes
 rus, the ISO 639-2 code for the Russian language
 RUS, the ISO 3166-1 alpha-3 code for the Russian Federation
 RUS, the IATA airport code for Marau Airport

Other places
 Ruś (disambiguation), the name of several Polish villages
 Rus, Jaén, a municipality in the Province of Jaén, Spain
 Rus, Sălaj, a commune in Sălaj County, Romania
 Ruse, Bulgaria, Bulgaria
 Ruski Krstur, Vojvodina, Serbia
 Rus, a village in Dumbrăviţa Commune, Maramureș County, Romania

Other uses
 Rus (1903), a Russian newspaper published intermittently from 1903 to 1908
 Rus (special forces), a unit of interior troops of the Russian Federation
 Rus-M, a cancelled Russian space rocket program

See also
 Pyc (disambiguation), in Latin characters
 Russ (disambiguation)